Avon Dassett is a village and civil parish in the Stratford district of Warwickshire, England, nestling among the Burton Dassett Hills about four miles east of Kineton and seven miles north of Banbury in Oxfordshire.  According to the 2001 and the 2011 censuses it had a population of 210. Israel Tonge was at one stage appointed rector of Avon Dassett - although according to Tonge "illegall practices" prevented him taking up the position. Avon Carrow is located in Avon Dassett, the former residence of John Profumo, the local MP in the 1960s. He was central to the Profumo affair, a sex and spy scandal in that era.

See also
St John the Baptist's Church, Avon Dassett

References

Warwickshire Towns & Villages, by Geoff Allen (2000)

External links 

 Avon Dassett Parish Council

Villages in Warwickshire